Ramagundam Airport  is a proposed airport located at Kesoram Cement Factory in Basanth Nagar serving the city of Ramagundam, in the Indian state of Telangana. The existing airstrip was served by Vayudoot in the 1980s until the airline was shut down. Currently, the Telangana State Government intends to further develop the airport.

History 
In the 1980s, Vayudoot used to serve the airport.

In 2008, the Government of undivided Andhra Pradesh invited for expressions of interest to develop eight minor airports in the state, including an airport at the existing Ramagundam airstrip. Each airport was expected to cost . The construction of this airport was chosen because Ramagundam has an industrial potential with one of the largest thermal power plants run by NTPC.

In July 2009, the government scrapped the plans as no companies posted bids for the construction of the airport. The companies believed the construction to be infeasible due to low expectation of revenues. The government has offered additional incentives including exemption from value added taxes and waiver of lease rentals for the first seven years once the airport is operational.

In August 2020, Airports Authority of India (AAI) has sought details about six proposed airports including this airport in the state of Telangana. AAI would be conducting a survey for the feasibility of constructing these airports, both infrastructure-wise and in terms of commercial returns.

References 

Airports in Telangana
Proposed airports in Telangana
Proposed infrastructure in Telangana
Buildings and structures in Telangana
Peddapalli district